Manuel Miguel Astorga Carreño (born 15 May 1937) is a Chilean kinesiologist and former footballer who played as a goalkeeper.

Club career
He started his career in 1956 with Universidad de Chile and was part of the famous Ballet Azul (Blue Ballet), as it was nicknamed Universidad de Chile in the 1960s.

International career
He made 10 appearances for Chile between 1960 and 1970. Also, he was part of the Chile squad in the 1962 FIFA World Cup.

Personal life
He is the father of Manuel Astorga Jr., a fitness coach who has worked with the former tennis players Marcelo Ríos, Nicolás Massú and Tommy Haas, in addition to several football teams.

After playing football, Astorga did mountain climbing, taking part of the Chile national team that reached the top of Mount Everest in 1983.

At the same time he was a footballer, he studied kinesiology and worked for both Universidad de Chile in the 1980s and Colo-Colo when the team became the Copa Libertadores champion, in addition to Deportes La Serena. Also, he has worked for Barros Luco Hospital and MEDS Clinic.

Honours

Club
Universidad de Chile
 Primera División (5): 1959, 1962, 1964, 1965, 1967

Individual
 Primera División Best Goalkeeper (3): 1962, 1963, 1964

References

1937 births
Living people
People from Iquique
Chilean footballers
Chile international footballers
Association football goalkeepers
Universidad de Chile footballers
C.D. Huachipato footballers
Deportes Magallanes footballers
Magallanes footballers
Audax Italiano footballers
Chilean Primera División players
Primera B de Chile players
Chilean mountain climbers
1962 FIFA World Cup players